Poor, Dear Margaret Kirby is a 1921 American silent drama film directed by William P.S. Earle and starring Elaine Hammerstein, Helen Lindroth and Warburton Gamble. It was produced by Selznick Pictures and shot at the company's studios in Fort Lee, New Jersey.

Cast
 Elaine Hammerstein as 	Margaret Kirby
 William B. Donaldson as John Kirby
 Ellen Burford as Lucille Yardsley 
 Helen Lindroth as Mrs. Dunning
 Warburton Gamble as Gordon Pell

References

Bibliography
 Connelly, Robert B. The Silents: Silent Feature Films, 1910-36, Volume 40, Issue 2. December Press, 1998.
 Munden, Kenneth White. The American Film Institute Catalog of Motion Pictures Produced in the United States, Part 1. University of California Press, 1997.

External links
 

1921 films
1921 drama films
1920s English-language films
American silent feature films
Silent American drama films
American black-and-white films
Films directed by William P. S. Earle
Selznick Pictures films
1920s American films